The NS 600 was a series of steam locomotives of the Nederlandse Spoorwegen (NS) and its predecessor Maatschappij tot Exploitatie van Staatsspoorwegen (SS).

For the operation of the railway lines Breda - Tilburg (opened on October 5 1863) and Harlingen - Leeuwarden (opened on October 27 1863), the SS ordered four steam locomotives with the wheel arrangement 1'A1' (2-2-2) from Beyer, Peacock & Company of Manchester, England. No. 1 and 2 were put into service in the south between Breda and Tilburg, No. 3 and 4 in the north. With the expansion of both railway lines, another 6 locomotives were ordered in 1866, which were given the numbers SS No. 79-84. In 1872 the series was renumbered as the continuous series 131–140. In 1876 another renumbering followed, this time in 251–260.

In the 1880s, these locomotives became less and less suitable for the heavier passenger trains. In 1882 six locomotives (Nos. 252, 253, 255, 256, 257 and 258) were rebuilt, with the front axle and the large driving wheel being replaced by two small driven axles. No. 252 acquired the larger boiler of No. 259 for which both locomotives were also renumbered. The same happened with Nos. 253 and 260. This also created two consecutive number series: Nos. 251–254 with a small boiler and still the wheel arrangement 1A1; and the Nos. 255–260 with a large boiler and the wheel arrangement B1. Between 1911 and 1915, Nos. 255-260 received new boilers, with the maximum working pressure remaining the same. In 1893, the factory numbers of Nos. 251 and 260 were swapped.

No. 253 was the first to be withdrawn in 1911, followed by Nos. 251 and 253 in 1913. When the fleets of the HSM and the SS was merged into the Dutch Railways in 1921, the only remaining locomotive with the wheel arrangement 1'A1' was given the NS number 501 and the locomotives with two driven axles converted to wheel arrangement B1', the NS numbers 601–606. Whether the 501 actually carried this number is uncertain, as the locomotive was not used since April 1921 and the physical renumbering took place in December. No. 501 is the only steam locomotive with only one driven axle that has survived into the NS era. No. 604 was withdrawn in 1922, the others followed in 1923.

Overview

Sources and references 

 R.C. Statius Muller, A.J. Veenendaal jr., H. Waldorp: De Nederlandse stoomlocomotieven. Uitg. De Alk, Alkmaar, 2005. .
 Het Utrechts Archief

Rolling stock of the Netherlands
Beyer, Peacock locomotives
Steam locomotives of the Netherlands
Maatschappij tot Exploitatie van Staatsspoorwegen